In Action is the second EP from rock band We Are Scientists. The album was released in October 2003.

Track listing
"Selective Memory"
"Coming Clean"
"That One Pop Gem"
"Riffmaster B"
"Secret Handshake"
"Bomb Inside the Bomb"

External links
 Official website
 What's The Word

2003 EPs
We Are Scientists albums